Quzluy-e Khaniyeh (also Romanized as Qūzlūy-e Khānīyeh; also known as Qūzlū-ye Khāneqāh and Qūzlū-ye Khānīyeh) is a village in Churs Rural District, in the Central District of Chaypareh County, West Azerbaijan Province, Iran. At the 2006 census, its population was 28, in 8 families.

References 

Populated places in Chaypareh County